M.A.N.T.I.S. is an American superhero television series that aired for one season on the Fox Network between August 26, 1994, and March 3, 1995.

The original two-hour TV movie pilot was produced by Sam Raimi and developed by Sam Hamm.

The Story
Wealthy, outspoken scientist Dr. Miles Hawkins is shot in the spine by a police sniper during a riot while trying to rescue a child, leaving him paralyzed from the waist down and using a wheelchair.

After losing a lawsuit against the police department and discovering evidence of a vast conspiracy against the black community, he angrily undergoes a change in political philosophy and uses his company's resources to invent a formfitting combination powered exoskeleton and bulletproof black body armor that not only enables him to walk while wearing it but in the process also endows him with superhuman strength, speed and agility, plus the ability to fire nonlethal paralysis darts from his wrists.

Using a vast array of technology, including a secret underwater lab called the Seapod deep beneath his secluded seaside mansion and a flying car/submarine called the Chrysalis to travel around the city at night, he secretly assumes the persona of the metal-masked vigilante known as the "M.A.N.T.I.S." ("Mechanically Augmented Neuro Transmitter Interception System", changed to "Mechanically Augmented NeuroTransmitter Interactive System" for the series) to find justice for himself and others.

The pilot featured strong roles for a variety of African-American actors, including Gina Torres as dedicated pathologist Dr. Amy Ellis, Bobby Hosea as ambitious reporter Yuri Barnes, Wendy Raquel Robinson and Christopher M. Brown as African students of Hawkins who act as his secret support staff in his fight against crime, and Steve James as handsome inner city youth club manager Antoine Pike.

The series that followed recast all the characters, save for the hero, to include quirky British scientist and exoskeleton co-inventor John Stonebrake (Roger Rees) and smart-mouthed, streetwise young bicycle courier Taylor Savage/Savidge (Christopher Gartin), with police detective Lt. Leora Maxwell (Galyn Görg) being the only other person of color as a regular on the show, and the plot was completely rebooted and simplified from that of the pilot.

Initially the series depicted the M.A.N.T.I.S. operating as an often-reluctant vigilante who only got involved in criminal situations when there was some sort of personal connection to him and his friends.  And while the costumed crimefighter was still pursued by police, the aforementioned conspiracy was now reduced down to the Machiavellian machinations of one man, evil industrialist and Miles' former business partner Solomon Box (Brion James / Andrew J. Robinson).

However, poor ratings led to an extensive retooling of the concept.  Midway through the show's run, minor recurring characters like Miles' clichéd sassy black housekeeper Lynette (Lorena Gale) were dropped, and more fantasy adventure elements were incorporated into the premise, including parallel universes, time travel, super-villains, and monsters.

In one particular episode, the M.A.N.T.I.S. is accidentally thrown 32 years into the future, where he finds that his own technology has been exploited to create a supercomputer called the City Eye which has enslaved the Port Columbia population.  He destroys it and sets the human population free before returning to his own time.

In the series' final installment, a trapped Miles and Leora are tragically killed battling an invisible prehistoric monster.  Stonebrake seals off the records and technology that had created the M.A.N.T.I.S., thus averting an apocalyptic future.

Cast
 Carl Lumbly – Dr. Miles Hawkins (22 episodes, 1994–1995)
 Roger Rees – John Stonebrake (22 episodes, 1994–1995)
 Christopher Gartin – Taylor Savage/Savidge (22 episodes, 1994–1995)
 Galyn Görg – Lt. Leora Maxwell (22 episodes, 1994–1995)
 Gary Graham – Capt. Ken Hetrick (9 episodes, 1994–1995)
 Jerry Wasserman – Det. Paul Warren (6 episodes, 1994)
 Garry Chalk – Detective Reid (4 episodes, 1994–1995)
 Blu Mankuma – Chief Grant (4 episodes, 1994–1995)
 Clabe Hartley – Tony (4 episodes, 1994)
 Lorena Gale - Lynette (3 episodes, 1994)
 Robert Hooks – Mayor Lew Mitchell (3 episodes, 1994–1995)
 Andrew Kavadas – MIB #2 / ... (3 episodes, 1994–1995)
 Martin Cummins – Paul Benton / ... (3 episodes, 1994)
 Peter Brost – Young Dr. Miles Hawkins (3 episodes, 1994–1995)

Production
While the pilot was filmed in Los Angeles the series itself was produced in Vancouver, British Columbia, Canada. Many Vancouver landmarks, such as the dome of Science World, appear, as do CN Rail cars on the train tracks.

It took three years to film due to Carl Lumbly being busy filming Nightjohn.

There were a number of differences between the pilot and the series.

In the pilot Hawkins wore a stylish suit and brown leather trenchcoat over the exoskeleton which lacked a skullcap, leaving the top of his hair bare, and the mask/headpiece was larger with special glowing green lenses which could hypnotize anyone who looked into his eyes, an ability dropped from the subsequent series as was his habit of leaving behind a small metal mantis as a calling card.

The setting was changed from Oceania City to Port Columbia, and all of the characters, with Miles Hawkins being the sole exception, were changed.

Episodes

Home media
The series was released on Amazon's Digital Download service Unbox on April 2, 2008.  A DVD set of the series, including the original pilot, was released on January 27, 2009.

References

External links
 

1994 American television series debuts
1995 American television series endings
1990s American black television series
1990s American science fiction television series
English-language television shows
Fox Broadcasting Company original programming
American superhero television series
Television shows filmed in Vancouver
Television superheroes
Television series by Universal Television
Television series created by Sam Raimi